Quantum compression may refer to:
Data compression as it relates to quantum computing
Quantum, one of several compression algorithms used by  CAB